A respondent is a person who is called upon to issue a response to a communication made by another. The term is used in legal contexts, in survey methodology, and in psychological conditioning.

Legal usage 
In legal usage, this specifically refers to the defendant in a legal proceeding commenced by a petition, or to an appellee, or the opposing party, in an appeal of a decision by an initial fact-finder.

In the United States Senate, the two sides in an impeachment trial are called the management and the respondent.

Survey and psychology usage 
In psychology, respondent conditioning is a synonym for classical conditioning or Pavlovian conditioning. Respondent behavior specifically refers to the behavior consistently elicited by a reflexive or classically conditioned stimulus.

In population survey, a respondent is a person replying with answers to a survey.  Depending on the survey questions and context, respondent answers may represent themselves as individuals, or a household or organization of which they are a part.

Other usages
In non-legal or informal usage, the term refers to one who refutes or responds to a thesis or an argument. In cross-cultural communication, the second person responding to the meaning or message from an original source which has been contextualised or decoded for the understanding of respondents as recipients or hearers of the message occurring from a different cultural context.

See also 
 Survey methodology

Civil law legal terminology
Survey methodology
Psychology experiments
American legal terminology